Rheumatism or rheumatic disorders are conditions causing chronic, often intermittent pain affecting the joints or connective tissue. Rheumatism does not designate any specific disorder, but covers at least 200 different conditions, including arthritis and  "non-articular rheumatism", also known as "regional pain syndrome" or "soft tissue rheumatism". There is a close overlap between the term soft tissue disorder and rheumatism. Sometimes the term "soft tissue rheumatic disorders" is used to describe these conditions.

The term "Rheumatic Diseases" is used in MeSH to refer to connective tissue disorders. The branch of medicine devoted to the diagnosis and therapy of rheumatism is called rheumatology.

Types
Many rheumatic disorders of chronic, intermittent pain (including joint pain, neck pain or back pain) have historically been caused by infectious diseases. Their etiology was unknown until the 20th century and not treatable. Postinfectious arthritis, also known as reactive arthritis, and rheumatic fever are other examples.

In the United States, major rheumatic disorders are divided into 10 major categories based on the nomenclature and classification proposed by the American College of Rheumatology (ACR) in 1983.

 Diffuse connective tissue diseases
 Rheumatoid arthritis
 Juvenile arthritis
 Systemic lupus erythematosus
 Sjögren syndrome
 Scleroderma
 Polymyositis
 Dermatomyositis
 Behçet's disease
 Relapsing polychondritis
 Arthritis associated with spondylitis (i.e. spondarthritis)
 Ankylosing spondylitis
 Reactive arthritis
 Psoriatic arthritis
 Osteoarthritis (i.e. osteoarthrosis, degenerative joint disease)
 Rheumatic syndromes associated with infectious agents (direct and indirect or reactive)
 Metabolic and endocrine diseases associated with rheumatic states
 Gout, pseudogout
 Neoplasms
 Neurovascular disorders
 Bone and cartilage disorders
 Extraarticular disorders
 Bursitis/Tendinitis of the shoulder, wrist, biceps, leg, knee cap (patella), ankle, hip, and Achilles tendon
 Capsulitis
 Miscellaneous disorders associated with articular manifestations
 Palindromic rheumatism is thought to be a form of rheumatoid arthritis.

Diagnosis
Blood and urine tests will measure levels of creatinine and uric acid to determine kidney function, an elevation of the ESR and CRP is possible. After a purine-restricted diet, another urine test will help determine whether the body is producing too much uric acid or the body isn't excreting enough uric acid. Rheumatoid factor may be present, especially in the group that is likely to develop rheumatoid arthritis. A fine needle is used to draw fluid from a joint to determine if there is any build up of fluid. The presence of uric acid crystals in the fluid would indicate gout. In many cases there may be no specific test, and it is often a case of eliminating other conditions before getting a correct diagnosis.

Management
Initial therapy of the major rheumatological diseases is with analgesics, such as paracetamol and non-steroidal anti-inflammatory drugs (NSAIDs). Steroids, especially glucocorticoids, and stronger analgesics are often required for more severe cases.

History
The term rheumatism stems from the Late Latin rheumatismus, ultimately from Greek ῥευματίζομαι "to suffer from a flux", with rheum meaning bodily fluids, i.e. any discharge of blood or bodily fluid.

Before the 17th century, the joint pain which was thought to be caused by viscous humours seeping into the joints was always referred to as gout, a word adopted in Middle English from Old French gote "a drop; the gout, rheumatism", not to be confused with the present day specific term referring to excess of uric acid.

The English term rheumatism in the current sense has been in use since the late 17th century, as it was believed that chronic joint pain was caused by excessive flow of rheum which means bodily fluids into a joint.

See also 
 Corbett's electrostatic machine

References

Further reading

External links 
 American College of Rheumatology
 National Institute of Arthritis and Musculoskeletal and Skin Diseases - US National Institute of Arthritis and Musculoskeletal and Skin Diseases

Rheumatology
Soft tissue disorders